Pauline O'Neill may refer to:
Pauline O'Neill (sister), first president of Saint Mary's College in Notre Dame, Indiana
Pauline O'Neill (suffrage leader) (1865–1961), suffrage leader, Arizona state legislator, and widow of Buckey O'Neill